A conder, in fishing, was someone who stood on the shore – usually on high ground – and signalled fishing boats as to the direction and location of shoals of fish, such as herrings, mackerel and pilchards.

People
 Charles Conder (1868–1909), English-born Australian artist
 Claude Reignier Conder (1848–1910) of the Palestine Exploration Fund; grandson of editor & author Josiah Conder
 Eustace Rogers Conder (1820–1892), English pastor, author; son of editor & author Josiah Conder
 James Conder (1761–1823), English businessman and numismatist after whom Conder Tokens are named; son of John Conder, uncle of editor & author Josiah Conder
 John Conder (1714–1781), nonconformist minister and College President; founder of the Conder family of England
 Josiah Conder (architect) (1852–1920), architect of European buildings in Japan; grandson of editor & author Josiah Conder
 Josiah Conder (editor and author) (1789–1855), English editor and author; grandson of John Conder
 Marston Conder (born 1955), New Zealand mathematician

Places
 Conder, Australian Capital Territory
 Conder Green, Lancashire, England
 River Conder, Lancashire, England
 Conder is also a residential apartment building in Melbourne Docklands by architect Nonda Katsalidis